Alexander McKay (April 19, 1843 – April 21, 1912) was mayor of Hamilton, Ontario from 1886 to 1887.

Born in Hamilton, Canada West, McKay was the son of William McKay and Jane Reid, both natives of Ireland. He was educated there and entered business as a hotel manager and then a grain merchant. In 1871, McKay married Catherine Marshall. After he retired from politics, McKay became a customs inspector.

References
 
The Canadian parliamentary companion, 1891 JA Gemmill

1843 births
1912 deaths
Conservative Party of Canada (1867–1942) MPs
Mayors of Hamilton, Ontario
Members of the House of Commons of Canada from Ontario